Charsadda attack may refer to:

Babrra massacre, in 1948
April 2007 Charsadda bombing
2007 Charsadda mosque bombing
2008 Charsadda bombing
2011 Charsadda bombing
Bacha Khan University attack, in 2016
2017 Charsadda suicide bombing
Charsadda arson attack, in 2021